Joy Kristin Smith (née Cheek, born June 25, 1988) is an American former professional women's basketball player in the WNBA and current assistant coach for the Clemson Tigers women's basketball team.  Joy was born in Hyattsville, Maryland and attended South Mecklenburg High School in Charlotte, North Carolina.

She played college basketball at Duke University. One of 26 former Duke standouts to register over 1,000 career points, Cheek played in 137 contests in her four years.  A four-year letterwinner from 2007 to 2010, she owns career averages of 8.4 points, 5.0 rebounds and 1.2 steals.  As a senior, Cheek averaged 9.9 points, 5.9 rebounds, 1.5 steals and 1.3 assists as she started all 36 contests for the Blue Devils.  She was named to the Memphis Regional All-Tournament team, All-ACC Tournament First Team, All-ACC Third Team and was a finalist for the Lowe's Senior Class Award.

Cheek was the 35th overall selection in the 2010 WNBA Draft by the Indiana Fever, playing in seven contests for the Fever before traveling overseas to play in Leszno, Poland. After signing a brief contract with the Washington Mystics to open the 2011 WNBA season, Cheek was prepared to play in Spain before accepting a job at  Duke University as an assistant coach.  She held this position from 2011 to 2013.

Duke statistics
Source

References 

WNBA Profile

1988 births
Living people
American women's basketball coaches
American women's basketball players
Basketball players from Maryland
Basketball players from Charlotte, North Carolina
Duke Blue Devils women's basketball players
Forwards (basketball)
Indiana Fever draft picks
Indiana Fever players
McDonald's High School All-Americans
Parade High School All-Americans (girls' basketball)
People from Hyattsville, Maryland
Washington Mystics players